is a 2002 Japanese animated adventure short film based on the Digimon franchise created by Akiyoshi Hongo, and its fourth series, Digimon Frontier. The short film is directed by Takahiro Imamura, written by Sukehiro Tomita, and produced by Toei Animation. The short film was released in Japan on June 20, 2002, as part of Toei Animation Summer 2002 Animation Fair, featuring alongside Kinnikuman: Muscle Ginseng Competition! The Great Chōjin War and Fierce Fight! Crush Gear Turbo: Kaiserburn's Challenge! films.

In the short film, Takuya and his friends ends up on an island, where a war between humanoid and beastial Digimons erupt.

Plot
Takuya and his companions are traveling through a desert when they find themselves ending up on a floating island known as the Lost Island and in civil war between human and beast Digimon. While ending up on a village of humanoid Digimon, Takuya, Junpei and Tomoki learn from Kotemon of a legend that the island was protected by their god Ornismon. Kotemon proceeds to take them to a neutral location where his friend Bearmon brought Koji and Izumi after they ended up in his village. After the two sides argue what they learned, Bearmon and Kote lead them to a mural of Ornismon with Bokomon deeming the DigiCode to be incomplete. Their peaceful meeting is broken up as Kotemon and Bearmon's older brothers Dinohyumon and Grizzlymon appear and battle each other. But after Takuya and Koji spirit evolve to Agunimon and KendoGarurumon to stop them, Dinohyumon and Grizzlymon take their respective brothers with them.

As the human Digimon prepare for battle after their leader d'Arcmon rallies the crowd, Takuya accepts Dinohyumon's recruitment offer to allow Tomoki to escape with Kotemon. A similar event with Junpei and Izumi spiriting Bearmon occurs at the beast Digimon village as Koji accepts Grizzlymon's offer to fight during a speech by the beast Digimons' leader Hippogriffomon. Izumi, Tomoki, Junpei, Bokomon, and Neemon help Bearmon, Kotemon, and many newborn Digimon assemble the writing under the mural. But upon its completion, Bokomon finds that Ornismon is actually an evil Digimon that oppressed the island before being defeated by The Anicent Warriors AncientGreymon and AncientGarurumon. Furthermore, after the group notices a missing piece in the mural that is in the same shape as the ornament both d'Arcmon and Hippogriffomon possess, Junpei and Izumi proceed to find Takuya and Koji while Tomoki, Bokomon, and Neemon stay to finish the mural of AncientGreymon and AncientGarurumon in hopes that they can find an answer to the crisis. 

At the battlefield, Takuya and Koji eventually spirit evolve to BurningGreymon and Lobomon to stop the fight but end up getting both sides to turn on them before Kazemon and Beetlemon arrive. The two revealed that on their way to their friends, they discovered a horrible secret: the two armies' leader being the same Digimon after accidentally catching d'Arcmon turning into Hippogriffomon. Exposed while forced to become d'Arcmon again, the fraud reveals to have been collecting the Fractal Code to revive and control Ornismon while assuming his true form: Murmukusmon. Overpowering the Legendary Warriors, Murmukusmon guides Ornismon to the murals of AncientGreymon and AncientGarurumon, which begin shining. Kotemon gives his life to protect them, and Bearmon's tears along with Kotemon's sacrifice summons spectral forms of the Ancient Warriors. Their appearance gives the DigiDestined a second wind with the island residents joining them as Agunimon takes out Murmukusmon before the Legendary Warriors destroy Ornismon. With Ornismon no more, the Lost Island returns to the Digital World with the two sides finally making peace with Kotemon turning up alive as he and Bearmon have a tearful reunion.

Voice cast

Production
The film was directed by Takahiro Imamura at Toei Animation, while Sukehiro Tomita and Tadayoshi Yamamuro from the television series provided the screenplay and animation direction respectively.

Release

Japanese release
The short film was released in Japan on June 20, 2002, as part of Toei Animation Summer 2002 Animation Fair, featuring alongside with Kinnikuman: Muscle Ginseng Competition! The Great Chōjin War and Fierce Fight! Crush Gear Turbo: Kaiserburn's Challenge! films.

English release
The film premiered on Jetix in the United States on November 27, 2005. Post production company Studiopolis produced the English dub as they did with the previous Digimon films, reuniting majority of the voice cast and director involved.

Reception

Box office
The short film was deemed as a box office failure, earning total of 800 million yen (US$6.8m),, where the film alone grossed about 460 million yen (US$5.9m)

Notes

References

External links

2000s Japanese films
Digimon films
2002 anime films
Toei Animation films
2002 short films
Anime short films
2000s animated short films